Bulok is a village in northern Tajikistan. It is part of the Asht District in Sughd Region.

References

Populated places in Sughd Region